Central Christian College of Kansas is a private evangelical Christian college in McPherson, Kansas, United States. Central Christian is affiliated with the Free Methodist Church.

Athletics
The Central Christian athletic teams are called the Tigers. The college is a member of the National Association of Intercollegiate Athletics (NAIA), primarily competing in the Sooner Athletic Conference (SAC) since the 2017–18 academic year. They are also a member of the National Christian College Athletic Association (NCCAA), primarily competing as an independent in the Central Region of the Division I level. The Tigers previously competed as an NAIA Independent within the Association of Independent Institutions (AII) from 2015–16 to 2016–17; and in the defunct Midlands Collegiate Athletic Conference (MCAC) from 2002–03 to 2014–15 (when the conference dissolved).

Central Christian competes in 16 intercollegiate varsity sports: Men's sports include baseball, basketball, cross country, golf, soccer, volleyball and wrestling; while women's sports include basketball, cross country, golf, soccer, softball, volleyball and wrestling; and co-ed sports include cheerleading and eSports.

References

External links
 
 Official athletics website

Buildings and structures in McPherson County, Kansas
Council for Christian Colleges and Universities
Education in McPherson County, Kansas
Educational institutions established in 1884
Evangelicalism in Kansas
Former Midlands Collegiate Athletic Conference schools
Liberal arts colleges in Kansas
Universities and colleges in the United States affiliated with the Free Methodist Church
1884 establishments in Kansas
Private universities and colleges in Kansas